Megalaspides is an extinct genus from a well-known class of fossil marine arthropods, the trilobites. It lived during the later part of the Arenig stage of the Ordovician Period, approximately 478 to 471 million years ago.

References

Asaphida genera
Asaphidae
Ordovician trilobites
Trilobites of Asia
Trilobites of Europe
Trilobites of North America